Shelley Rae (born 1 June 1976) is a former English female rugby union player. She represented  at the 2002 and 2006 Women's Rugby World Cup. Rae retired from international rugby in 2008. She scored her first try in 2001 when  beat  22-17 in Auckland, a side that previously went undefeated for 10 years. She also won the IRB Female Player of the Year Award in 2001.

References

1976 births
Living people
England women's international rugby union players
English female rugby union players
Female rugby union players
Rugby union players from Cambridge